Pleurochrysis is a genus of cuckoo wasps from the New World, with 36 species distributed from Mexico to Argentina. One species is a parasitoid of the potter wasp Cyphomenes anisitsii.

References

Hymenoptera genera
Chrysidinae
Hymenoptera of South America